Pingasa rufofasciata is a moth of the family Geometridae first described by Frederic Moore in 1888. It is found in China (Hubei, Hunan, Guangxi, Zhejiang, Yunnan, Fujian, Guizhou, Jiangxi, Sichuan).

References

Moths described in 1888
Pseudoterpnini